Sounds of Silence is the second studio album by American folk rock duo Simon & Garfunkel, released on January 17, 1966. The album's title is a slight modification of the title of the duo's first major hit, "The Sound of Silence", which originally was released as "The Sounds of Silence". The song had earlier been released in an acoustic version on the album Wednesday Morning, 3 A.M., and later on the soundtrack to the movie The Graduate. Without the knowledge of Paul Simon or Art Garfunkel, electric guitars, bass and drums were overdubbed by Columbia Records staff producer Tom Wilson on June 15, 1965. This new version was released as a single in September 1965, and opens the album.

"Homeward Bound" was released on the album in the UK, placed at the beginning of Side 2 before "Richard Cory". It was later released in the US on the following album, Parsley, Sage, Rosemary and Thyme. It was also released as part of the box set Simon & Garfunkel Collected Works, on both LP and CD. Many of the songs in the album had been written by Paul Simon while he lived in London during 1965.

Solo acoustic versions of "I Am a Rock", "Leaves That Are Green", "April Come She Will", "A Most Peculiar Man", and "Kathy's Song" had appeared on The Paul Simon Songbook, released in August 1965 in England as had another version of the title track. "Richard Cory" was based on the poem "Richard Cory" by Edwin Arlington Robinson, "Somewhere They Can't Find Me" was essentially a rewrite of the previous album's "Wednesday Morning, 3 A.M.", "We've Got a Groovy Thing Goin'" had appeared on the b-side of "The Sound of Silence" a few months before and "Anji" was a cover of an instrumental piece by guitarist Davey Graham whom Simon had met in England. Hence the only brand new Paul Simon composition on the album was "Blessed".

The album is also included in its entirety as part of the Simon & Garfunkel box sets Collected Works and The Columbia Studio Recordings (1964–1970). On March 22, 2013, it was announced that the album will be preserved by the Library of Congress in the National Recording Registry, calling it "culturally, historically, or aesthetically significant."

Cover artwork
The album cover photo features the duo on a trail looking back towards the camera. It was shot at Franklin Canyon Park in Los Angeles, California. The secondary school scarves they are wearing were from The Campion School, Hornchurch, UK. This school was attended by the boys of the Brentwood family, where Paul lodged during his time in the UK. The back of the LP has candid shots of the duo and quotes a few lyrics from each song.

There are three variations of the original LP's artwork. The first issue lists the duo's names' fully capitalized on one line, the album title fully capitalized on another, and no song titles. The second issue capitalizes only the first letter of each word, and features the tracklist. The third has the same front cover as the second, but the back cover airbrushes out the copies of Tiger Beat magazine Garfunkel is holding in the photos.

The original LP label mistakenly spells "Anji" as "Angie" and credits it to Bert Jansch, who had recorded it for his 1965 debut album. The back cover of the original LP sleeve properly credits Davey Graham as composer but retains the "Angie" misspelling. Both errors were corrected for subsequent reissues.

On older LP and CD issues of the album, "The Sound of Silence" is titled as "The Sounds of Silence" on both the cover and label, and "We've Got a Groovy Thing Goin'" is titled "We've Got a Groovey Thing Goin'".

Track listing

Original release

Produced by Bob Johnston
 Sides one and two were combined as tracks 1–11 on CD reissues.

Track 12 Produced by Bob Johnston
Tracks 13–15 Produced by Paul Simon, Art Garfunkel & Roy Halee

Track listing (UK version)

Personnel
 Paul Simon – lead vocals, guitar
 Art Garfunkel – lead vocals
 Fred Carter Jr., Glen Campbell, Joe South – guitar
 Larry Knechtel – keyboards
 Joe Osborn – bass guitar
 Hal Blaine – drums
 Bob Johnston – producer

Sounds of Silence was recorded in April, June and December 1965 at CBS Studios in New York City, New York and Los Angeles, California.

"The Sound of Silence" (electric overdubs) personnel
 Al Gorgoni, Vinnie Bell – guitar
 Joe Mack – bass guitar
 Bobby Gregg – drums

"The Sound of Silence" overdubs were recorded at Columbia's "Studio A" at 799 Seventh Avenue near 52nd Street by Columbia Records staff producer Tom Wilson on June 15, 1965. Neither Paul Simon nor Art Garfunkel were aware of the session or the plan to release an electric remix of the song until after the overdubs had been recorded.

Notes
English singer-songwriter Billy Bragg lifted the opening lines of "Leaves That Are Green" ("I was 21 years when I wrote this song/I'm 22 now, but I won't be for long") for his song "A New England", which appeared on Bragg's 1983 EP Life's a Riot with Spy Vs Spy.  These same lyrics can be found in the Kirsty MacColl version of this song. Released as a cover in 1984, the song was MacColl's biggest solo hit—reaching #7 in the UK and #8 in Ireland.
The Tremeloes' recording of "Blessed" became their 1966 "solo debut" single (without Brian Poole).
Them recorded "Richard Cory" as a single in 1966. Wings (with Denny Laine on lead vocals) covered "Richard Cory" on their 1976 live triple album Wings over America.
Nancy Wilson (of Heart) performs a cover of "Kathy's Song" on her 1999 album Live from McCabe's Guitar Shop.
Eva Cassidy covered "Kathy's Song" on her 2000 CD Time After Time, released four years after her death.
"Somewhere They Can't Find Me" is essentially a reworking of the title track of the duo's first album, Wednesday Morning, 3 A.M. It was recorded along with "We've Got a Groovy Thing Goin'" a few months before producer Tom Wilson dubbed electric instruments on "Sounds of Silence". The recurring descending bass line in the track as well as its introductory guitar riff were borrowed from Davey Graham's acoustic guitar piece "Anji", a cover of which follows on the album. (The melody line of the chorus in "We've Got a Groovy Thing Goin'" shows a similarity to a riff heard within the Bert Jansch version of Graham's piece, as well as the Sounds of Silence version; the line is similar to the theme in "Work Song" by Nat Adderley.)
The song "Richard Cory" was based on a poem with the same title by Edwin Arlington Robinson. The chorus, however, is entirely of Simon's composition.
The song "April Come She Will" bears structural resemblance to a traditional English rhyme, "Cuckoo, cuckoo, what do you do?", a phenology of the common cuckoo from April through September.

Charts

Further reading 
 Charlesworth, Chris, The Complete Guide to the Music of Paul Simon and Simon & Garfunkel, Omnibus Press 1996
 Maclauchlan, Paul, "Paul Simon Discography 1955 to 1999 : Simon & Garfunkel – 1964 to 1971"
 Williams, Paul, "Sounds of Silence: Simon & Garfunkel", Crawdaddy! magazine, first issue, January 30, 1966; reprinted in The Crawdaddy! book : writings (and images) from the magazine of rock, by Paul Williams, Milwaukee, WI : Hal Leonard Corp., 2002.

References

External links
 Sony Music

Simon & Garfunkel albums
1966 albums
Albums produced by Bob Johnston
United States National Recording Registry recordings
Columbia Records albums
Albums produced by Tom Wilson (record producer)
United States National Recording Registry albums